Adi Remets (Tigrinya: ዓዲ ረመፅ), is a town in the Tigray Region of Ethiopia. It is the administrative center of the Welkait woreda.

Demographics  
Based on the 2007 Census conducted by the Central Statistical Agency of Ethiopia (CSA), this town has a total population of 5,203, of whom 2,446 are men and 2,757 women. A total of 1,481 households were counted in this woreda, resulting in an average of 3.51 persons to a household, and 1,432 housing units. The 1994 census reported it had a total population of 2,497 in 670 households and living in 670 houses.

References 

Populated places in the Tigray Region

Tigray regional state